James Sherwood Houghton (20 September 1891 – 20 June 1973) was an Australian rules footballer who played with .

Sources

1891 births
1973 deaths
Australian rules footballers from Victoria (Australia)
University Football Club players